Charles Ellis Clapper (December 20, 1875 – September 14, 1937) was an American wrestler who competed in the 1904 Summer Olympics. In 1904, he won a bronze medal in featherweight category. He was born in Memphis, Missouri and died in Chicago, Illinois.

References

External links
profile

1875 births
1937 deaths
Wrestlers at the 1904 Summer Olympics
American male sport wrestlers
Olympic bronze medalists for the United States in wrestling
Medalists at the 1904 Summer Olympics
People from Memphis, Missouri